Liliana Rezende de Castro (born 29 June 1979) is an Ecuadorian-born Brazilian actress.

Life 
Castro was born in Quito, the capital of Ecuador where her father was a diplomat. Her family also lived in Italy and Venezuela, before relocating to Brazil. She began acting at ten years old, and graduated in theatre. Her first professional acting role came in 1999 in the play As Fúrias. Currently, she is also a teaching assistant at Socratica, a non-profit teaching organisation.

Filmography
 2008: Pseudociese – Teresa
 2007: Podecrer! – Silvinha
 2006: O Ano em Que Meus Pais Saíram de Férias – Irene
 2006: Una Vida Sin Sorpresas – Marina

TV work
 2017: PSI – Maria Clara (HBO)
 2014: Só Garotas – Olivia (Multishow)
 2012: Fora de Controle – Virgínia	(Rede Record)
 2010:	Ribeirão do Tempo – Filomena Miranda Durrel (Rede Record)
 2008: Os Mutantes - Caminhos do Coração – Janete (Rede Record)
 2007: Mandrake – Marcinha (HBO)
 2007: Caminhos do Coração – Janete Mendes Martinelli (Rede Record)
 2005: Alma Gêmea – Luna (Rede Globo)
 2004: Da Cor do Pecado – Olívia (Rede Globo)
 2002: Sabor da Paixão – Laiza (Rede Globo)
 2002: Ilha Rá-Tim-Bum – Polca (TV Cultura)
 1999: Força de um Desejo - Ana (cameo) (Rede Globo)

Theatre work
 2007: Por Uma Vida Um Pouco Menos Ordinária – Natália
 2006: Não Existem Níveis Seguros Para Consumo Destas Substâncias – Beatriz
 2006: Toda Nudez Será Castigada – Geni
 2005: Tudo É Permitido – Nina
 2003: Casca de Nóz – Pberbit
 2000: Sob o Sol Em Meu Leito Após a Água – Alícia
 1999/2005: Alice Através do Espelho – Alice
 1999: As Fúrias – Altea

References

External links
Liliana De Castro at the Internet Movie Database

1979 births
Brazilian expatriates in the United States
Brazilian film actresses
Brazilian people of Argentine descent
Brazilian telenovela actresses
Living people
People from Quito
Brazilian stage actresses